María Rivas may refer to:

 María Rivas (singer) (born 1960), Venezuelan Latin jazz singer and composer
 María Rivas (actress) (1931–2013), Mexican actress